The Journal of Genetic Counseling is a bi-monthly peer-reviewed medical journal focusing on genetic counseling. It is produced by the National Society of Genetic Counselors (NSGC) and published by Springer Publishing Company from 1992 to 2018 and is currently published by John Wiley & Sons.

External links
 

Medical genetics journals
Wiley (publisher) academic journals
Publications established in 1992
English-language journals
Bimonthly journals